Norwegian County Road 5627 is a  long road which crosses the Aurlandsfjellet mountains. The barren mountain plateau offers views  down on the Aurlandsfjord. It is designated a National Tourist Route in Norway.

Prior to the 2020 county merger, the road was called County Road 243, but after merging the counties, there were two county roads with the same number, so this one was changed.

References

5627
Lærdal
Aurland
National Tourist Routes in Norway